In mathematics, the Parry–Sullivan invariant (or Parry–Sullivan number) is a numerical quantity of interest in the study of incidence matrices in graph theory, and of certain one-dimensional dynamical systems. It provides a partial classification of non-trivial irreducible incidence matrices.

It is named after the English mathematician Bill Parry and the American mathematician Dennis Sullivan, who introduced the invariant in a joint paper published in the journal Topology in 1975.

Definition

Let A be an n × n incidence matrix. Then the Parry–Sullivan number of A is defined to be

where I denotes the n × n identity matrix.

Properties

It can be shown that, for nontrivial irreducible incidence matrices, flow equivalence is completely determined by the Parry–Sullivan number and the Bowen–Franks group.

References

Dynamical systems
Matrices
Algebraic graph theory
Graph invariants